The 1972 All-Ireland Under-21 Football Championship was the ninth staging of the All-Ireland Under-21 Football Championship since its establishment by the Gaelic Athletic Association in 1964.

Cork entered the championship as defending champions, however, they were defeated by Kerry in the Munster final.

On 22 October 1972, Galway won the championship following a 2-6 to 0-7 defeat of Kerry in the All-Ireland final. This was their first All-Ireland title.

Results

All-Ireland Under-21 Football Championship

Semi-finals

Final

Statistics

Miscellaneous

 Tyrone win the Ulster title for the first time in their history.

References

1972
All-Ireland Under-21 Football Championship